Firas Mohamad Al Khatib (born 9 June 1983) is a Syrian former footballer who mainly played as a forward. He is the Syria national team all-time top goalscorer, with 36 goals.

Club career

Early life

Al-Khatib began playing football at Al-Karamah SC, he was included in the club's categories U-14, with whom he played for two seasons. One of the most important achievements of Al Khatib with youth Al Karamah was the victory of the Republic Cup and the title of the league's top scorer twice 1994–95, 1995–96. He then went on to play for Al Karamah U-17 in 1997, where he was crowned with the league title in the same year.

He also won the top scorer title. All this helped the young boy reach the youth team. During two seasons with U-19 team, he managed to win the league title and the second scorer.

Al Karamah

Al Khatib started his professional career in the Syrian Premier League with Al-Karamah in the Season 1999–2000. On 6 October 2000, he scored his first goal in the Syrian Premier League against Al-Futowa which 1–1 finished.

During 2001, he spent two trials in Belgium; first with Gent and the second with Anderlecht.

Al Naser

In August 2002, he transferred to Kuwaiti Club Al-Naser, and played in Kuwaiti Premier League for the first time. He then moved to Al-Arabi, which also competed in the Kuwaiti Premier League.

Al Arabi

With Al-Arabi he won the Kuwait Emir Cup three times, the Kuwait Crown Prince Cup twice and the Kuwait Super Cup once. He also scored 134 goals for the club and became a legend in the club.

In June 2005, he was loaned out to Al-Ahli in Qatar for one match, and played alongside Pep Guardiola.

Qadsia

On 24 August 2009, Al Khatib signed a two-year contract with Al-Qadsia in the Kuwaiti Premier League and played alongside his old teammate Jehad Al-Hussain.

In July 2012, he participated in three games with Nottingham Forest, scoring once in a trial of month. He impressed manager Sean O'Driscoll enough that the club were looking to sign him on a permanent basis but he was denied a work permit and the club was unable to sign him.

Zakho

On 10 September 2012, he tweeted that he signed with Iraqi Premier League club Zakho FC officially.

Shanghai Shenhua

He left Iraq to join Sergio Batista's Chinese Super League side Shanghai Shenhua at February 2013. He scored his first goal in his Chinese Super League debut.

Return to Al Arabi

He became a free agent at the end of the 2013–14 football season and returned to Kuwait. He declined an offer from Kuwait SC and joined Al-Arabi SC on a 2-year deal.

During the first derby against Al-Salmiya SC, Al-Khatib scored his 100th league goal, but Al-Arabi SC lost the match 3–2.

Al-Khatib ended the season with 20 goals and shared the VIVA Premier League 2014–15 top league scorer with Patrick Fabiano. His total goal tally in all competitions was 24 goals. In 2015–16, he was selected in the VIVS Premier League 1st Team alongside teammate Ali Maqseed. Al-Khatib also won the VPL Golden Boot and top scorer of Al-Arabi with 27 goals; his highest tally in any season with any team.

Al Salmiya

In September 2017, he joined to Al-Salmiya, and scored 11 goals in his Kuwaiti Premier League.
He became the best goalscorer in Kuwait Premier League history after he scored 147 goals, exceeding many Kuwaiti legends.

Retirement

On 29 September 2019, Al-Khatib announced his retirement from football after spending the whole summer without a club. He finished his career scoring 349 goals to achieve the 19th place in the list of world's best goal scorer of 21st century, as well as being the all-time top scorer of all Kuwaiti domestic competitions with 210 goals.

International career
Between 2001 and 2002, Al-Khatib played for the Syrian U-17 team. He played for Syria in the AFC U-17 Championship 2002 in the United Arab Emirates and was part of the Syrian U-23 team that participated in the AFC Olympic qualification campaign for the 2004 Summer Olympics.

Al-Khatib was a regular for the Syria national football team from 2001 to 2012. His international debut was at the FIFA World Cup qualification 2002, when he came on as a substitute for Khaled Al Zaher in the match against Philippine on 4 May 2001 in the Al-Hamadaniah Stadium in Aleppo. On 11 May 2001 he scored one goal in the FIFA World Cup qualification 2002 match against Laos the match was finished 9–0 for Syria.

From 2012 to 2017, Al-Khatib boycotted the Syrian national football team to protest president Bashar al-Assad and his government's airstrikes against Al-Khatib's hometown of Homs. On 23 March 2017, al-Khatib re-joined Syrian national football team and expressed support for Assad.

He was not included in the final squad of 2019 AFC Asian Cup after getting injured about a month before the tournament, although, he claimed that he was capable of participating if the manager called him because his injury was minor and he could be part of the second match at least. It was really disappointing to him as he mentioned many times on Bein Sports as he was one of the pundits there during the tournament. He was one of the first people who asked to sack Stange after the lost against Jordan. In an interview diffused 20 March 2019, he denied any rows between players about the captaincy before and during Asian cup 2019, and denied also what Omar Al Somah said earlier about falling out for the captaincy armband.

On 5 September 2019, Al Khatib played against Philippine in the 2022 FIFA World Cup qualification; hence he became the first Asian and seventh footballer in total to participate in six different World Cup qualifiers, other footballers are: Gianluigi Buffon, Essam El Hadary, Pat Jennings, Russell Latapy, Víctor René Mendieta Ocampo and Dwight Yorke.

Managerial career
In 2019–20, Al Khatib became an assistant coach at Al-Salmiya. In June 2021, he was appointed as the head coach of his hometown club Al Karamah. A few days later, Al-Khatib refrained for Al Karama coaching due to "family circumstances". In April 2022, Firas became the coach of the Iraqi club Zakho. Three months later, in July 2022, Firas returns to Kuwait as coach of Al-Fahaheel.

Career statistics

International

International goals
Scores and results list Syria's goal tally first.

Honours

Club
Al-Arabi
 Kuwait Emir Cup: 2004–05, 2005–06, 2007–08
 Kuwait Crown Prince Cup: 2006–07, 2014–15 
 Kuwait Super Cup: 2007–08

Al-Qadsia
 Kuwaiti Premier League: 2009–10, 2010–11, 2011–12
 Kuwait Emir Cup: 2009–10, 2011–12
 Kuwait Super Cup: 2009

Kuwait SC
 Kuwaiti Premier League: 2016–17
 Kuwait Crown Prince Cup: 2016–17
 Kuwait Super Cup: 2016
 Kuwait Emir Cup: 2016–17

International
Syria
 West Asian Games 2005: Runner-up
 Nehru Cup Runner-up (2): 2007, 2009

Individual
 Syria's all-time record goalscorer: (36 goals)
 Top Goalscorer Kuwaiti Premier League: 2004–05 (13 goals), 2010–11 (14 goals), 2014–15 (20 goals), 2015–16 (23 goals)
 Top Goalscorer Kuwait Emir Cup: 2004–05 (3 goals)
 Top Goalscorer Kuwait Crown Prince Cup: 2003–04 (3 goals)
 Top Goalscorer Kuwait Federation Cup: 2008–09 (8 goals)
 Top Goalscorer of the Shanghai Shenhua's squad: 2013–14 (11 goals)
 2011 AFC Annual Awards Nominated
 VIVA Premier League 1st phase Team: 2015–16
 2015–16 VPL Golden Boot: (23 goals)
 VIVA Premier League Player of the Month: September 2017

Personal life
He is married and has 6 children.

Notes

References

External links

 

1983 births
Living people
Sportspeople from Homs
Syrian footballers
Association football forwards
Syria international footballers
Al-Karamah players
Al-Nasr SC (Kuwait) players
Al-Arabi SC (Kuwait) players
Al Ahli SC (Doha) players
Qadsia SC players
Umm Salal SC players
Shanghai Shenhua F.C. players
Syrian expatriate footballers
Expatriate footballers in Kuwait
Syrian expatriate sportspeople in Kuwait
Syrian expatriate sportspeople in Iraq
Expatriate footballers in Qatar
Expatriate footballers in China
Syrian expatriate sportspeople in China
2011 AFC Asian Cup players
Syrian expatriate sportspeople in Qatar
Chinese Super League players
Footballers at the 2006 Asian Games
Qatar Stars League players
Asian Games competitors for Syria
Syrian Premier League players
Kuwait SC players
Kuwait Premier League players
Kuwait Premier League managers
Al-Fahaheel FC managers
Zakho FC managers
Iraqi Premier League managers
Expatriate football managers in Kuwait
Expatriate football managers in Iraq
Syrian expatriate football managers